Care for the Wild International is an animal charity, a non-governmental organization established in 1984 and based in the United Kingdom. It supports wildlife projects and it campaigns on animal rights issues in Britain and around the world.

History
Care for the Wild International was set up by Dr Bill Jordan in 1984 from his bookshop in Horsham, West Sussex in the United Kingdom. As the charity grew, it moved to new premises but it is still based in Horsham. It is now an international organisation with an annual income of over £700,000, using the money to fund projects and campaigns both in the United Kingdom and overseas.

Mission
The stated aim of Care for the Wild International is to "rescue, protect and defend animals in need around the globe". It helps fund rescue centres and animal sanctuaries caring for abandoned, injured and orphaned wild animals in the United Kingdom and in Africa. It operates an "adoption" scheme under which donors can target their donations towards specific objectives. Protection of wildlife is done through supporting projects such as anti-poaching patrols and campaigns against the use of snares. It seeks to educate people about the importance of their local wildlife and on the way to minimise conflicts between people and animals. Care for the Wild International joins with other campaigning organisations to try to defend the rights of animals, taking part in both local actions, such as opposing badger culling, and international actions to limit the trade in endangered species.

Projects and campaigns
The stance of Care for the Wild International on the poaching of elephants is backed by its funding of anti-poaching patrols and an elephant orphanage coupled with a re-release programme. This it does in association with the David Sheldrick Wildlife Trust in Kenya which manages an orphanage for motherless elephants and rhinoceroses. 
In April 2005, Care for the Wild International joined with the Wildlife Trust of India to confront the 14th Dalai Lama about the trade in tiger skins in Tibet, a campaign that changed attitudes in Tibet on the use of tiger pelts as clothing.

Another campaign has endeavoured to prevent the sale of live turtles as food at Tesco supermarkets in China. Other campaigns have targeted the poaching of rhinoceroses for their horns, and the trade in ivory in the United States which imports large quantities of illegal ivory from poached elephants and which CITES has described as an "ivory trade problem country".

Care for the Wild International has joined with the Center for Biological Diversity to produce a report "Extinction: It’s Not Just for Polar Bears" which describes the effects that climate change is having on the Arctic. The report describes the changes taking place in the Arctic and what species are affected. It also provides an action plan for mitigating the problem. Other scientific reports have covered the ivory trade, the Chinese fur industry, the fate of tigers, the evidence supporting badger culling, the impact that hunting bushmeat has on primate populations and the management of elephants in South Africa.

References

Animal charities based in the United Kingdom
Organizations established in 1984